Acy or ACY may refer to:

Places

France
Acy, Aisne
Acy-Romance, Ardennes
Acy-en-Multien, Oise

United Kingdom
 Abercynon railway station (National Rail code: ACY), a railway station on the Merthyr Line in South Wales
 Archway tube station (London Underground code: ACY), a tube station on the High Barnet branch of the Northern line in Archway, London

United States
Acy, Louisiana
 Atlantic City, New Jersey, a city in southern New Jersey known for its boardwalk and casinos
 Atlantic City International Airport (IATA code: ACY) an airport in Egg Harbor Township that serves the Atlantic City area
 Atlantic City Rail Terminal (Amtrak code: ACY), a railway station on New Jersey Transit's Atlantic City Line

People with the surname
Quincy Acy (born 1990), American basketball player

Other uses
 Akron, Canton and Youngstown Railroad, a former railroad in Ohio, US
 Cypriot Maronite Arabic, a moribund variety of Arabic spoken by the Maronite community of Cyprus